Rachael Ellering (born December 28, 1992) is an American professional wrestler. She is a former Impact Knockouts Tag Team Champion.

She is the daughter of Paul Ellering. She has worked in WWE's NXT brand under the ring name Rachael Evers.

Professional wrestling career

Early career 

Ellering trained at the Storm Wrestling Academy, and graduated during December 2015. She went on to debut in Prairie Wrestling Alliance on November 21, 2015, in a match with Lance Storm against Brett Morgan and Gisele Shaw. Ellering made her Shine Wrestling debut at Shine 34 in a match won by Tessa Blanchard. In a rematch at Shine 35, Ellering won.

Ellering made appearances in Impact Wrestling initially at the March 2, 2017, television tapings competing in a match against Sienna in a losing effort. The following day, Ellering competed in the company's One Night Only pay-per-view series, Knockouts Knockdown 2017 against Laurel Van Ness in another losing effort.

WWE (2016–2020) 
Ellering made her WWE debut on NXT at the April 28, 2016, taping, in a match won by Alexa Bliss. Ellering returned to NXT on the September 14 episode under the name Rachael Fazio, losing a match to Liv Morgan, and on November 11, losing to Ember Moon. On May 3, 2017, Ellering participated in a number one contender's battle royal, but was eliminated by Aliyah. On the June 21 episode, she faced Sonya Deville in a losing effort.

On July 13, 2017, Ellering, under the ring name Rachael Evers, entered the Mae Young Classic tournament, defeating Marti Belle in her first round match. The following day, Evers was eliminated from the tournament in the second round by Abbey Laith. In 2018, Evers was announced as one of the competitors in the 2nd Mae Young Classic; she was defeated by the villainous Hiroyo Matsumoto in the opening round.

In January 2019 it was revealed that Ellering signed with WWE and would start appearing on NXT. Shortly thereafter she began appearing at NXT events under her real name. On July 28, 2019, Ellering suffered a torn ACL at an NXT live event sidelining her for over a year. In May 2020, Ellering was released from her WWE contract along with several other superstars due to budget cuts stemming from the COVID-19 pandemic.

All Elite Wrestling (2020) 
Ellering made her All Elite Wrestling AEW Debut on August 10 as part of the woman's Tag Team Tournament shown on the AEW YouTube Channel partnering with AEW Spanish commentator and former WWE wrestler and backstage personality Dasha Gonzalez in a losing effort against Diamante and Ivelisse Vélez. The following night Ellering made her AEW Dark debut on the August 11 episode in a losing effort against Penelope Ford.

Impact Wrestling (2021–2022)
Ellering made her debut on the April 22, 2021 episode of Impact!, saving Jordynne Grace from a beat down by the Knockouts Tag Team Champions Fire 'N Flava (Kiera Hogan and Tasha Steelz), and was announced by Grace that she would be her tag team partner at Rebellion. Three days later at the event, Ellering and Grace defeated Fire 'N Flava to win the Knockouts tag titles for the first time. On May 15, at Under Siege, they dropped the titles back to Fire 'N Flava. Five days later, Ellering was challenged to a match by Grace, and she defeated her. On the June 3 episode of Impact!, she and Grace challenged Fire 'N Flava to a rematch for the Knockout Tag Team Championship, but failed to regain them. Two weeks later, Ellering lost to Tenille Dashwood after being blinded by Kaleb with a K's camera light.

On July 31 at Homecoming, Ellering teamed with Tommy Dreamer to compete in a tournament to crown a Homecoming King and Queen, beating Brian Myers and Missy Hyatt in the first round but lost to Decay (Crazzy Steve and Rosemary) in the semifinals. In October, she competed in the Knockouts Knockdown tournament, to determine who will get a future shot at the Impact Knockouts Championship, defeating Lady Frost in the quarterfinals but lost to eventual winner Mercedes Martinez in the semifinals. At Bound for Glory, Ellering participated in the Call Your Shot Gauntlet match, where the winner could choose any championship match of their choice, eliminating Savannah Evans but was eliminated by Tasha Steelz.

On February 18, 2022, it was confirmed that Rachael was no longer working with Impact Wrestling.

Personal life 
Ellering is the daughter of Paul Ellering. She is in a relationship with professional wrestler Chris Hero.

Championships and accomplishments

Powerlifting 
World Powerlifting Federation
 2014 Bronze Medalist

Professional wrestling 
Impact Wrestling
Impact Knockouts Tag Team Championship (1 time) – with Jordynne Grace
IMPACT Year End Awards (1 time)
Knockouts Tag Team of the Year (2021) – with Jordynne Grace
Maverick Pro Wrestling
MPW Women's Championship (1 time)
 Pro Wrestling Illustrated
Ranked No. 87 of the top 100 female wrestlers in the PWI Female 100 in 2019
Pro Wrestling Magic
PWM Women's Championship (1 time)
Resistance Pro Wrestling
 RPW Women's Title Tournament (2016)
 RPW Women's Championship (1 time)
WrestleCircus
 WrestleCircus Lady of the Ring Championship (1 time)

References

External links 

1992 births
Living people
Sportspeople from St. Cloud, Minnesota
American female professional wrestlers
Professional wrestlers from Minnesota
American powerlifters
Female powerlifters
People from Sauk Centre, Minnesota
21st-century American women